The 2022–23 San Jose Sharks season is the 32nd season for the National Hockey League franchise that was established on May 9, 1990.

Bob Boughner was fired on July 1, 2022, and replaced by David Quinn.

On March 14, the Sharks were eliminated from playoff contention after a 6–5 overtime loss to the Columbus Blue Jackets.

Standings

Divisional standings

Conference standings

Current roster

Schedule

Preseason
The preseason schedule was announced on July 6, 2022.

Regular season
The regular season schedule was announced on July 6, 2022, and began with two games against the Nashville Predators in Prague for the NHL Global Series.

Player statistics
(As of March 18, 2023)

Skaters

Goaltenders

†Denotes player spent time with another team before joining the Sharks. Stats reflect time with the Sharks only.
‡Denotes player was traded mid-season. Stats reflect time with the Sharks only.

Transactions
The Sharks have been involved in the following transactions during the 2022–23 season.

Key:

 Contract is entry-level.

 Contract initially takes effect in the 2023–24 season.

Trades

Notes:
 San Jose retains 34% of Burns' remaining contract.
 San Jose will receive the lower of either Carolina's or Philadelphia's 3rd-round pick in 2023.
 San Jose retains 50% of Meier's remaining contract in 2023.
 Tampa Bay retains 50% of Namestnikov's remaining contract in 2023.

Players acquired

Players lost

Signings

Draft picks

Below are the San Jose Sharks' selections at the 2022 NHL Entry Draft, which will be held on July 7 and 8, 2022 in Montreal, Quebec.

Notes:
 The San Jose Sharks' first-round pick went to the Arizona Coyotes as the result of a trade on July 7, 2022, that sent Carolina's first-round-pick in 2022 (27th overall), a second-round pick in 2022 (34th overall) and the Islanders' second-round pick in 2022 (45th overall) to San Jose in exchange for this pick.
 The Carolina Hurricanes' first-round pick went to the San Jose Sharks as the result of a trade on July 7, 2022, that sent a first-round pick in 2022 (11th overall) to Arizona in exchange for a second-round pick in 2022 (34th overall), the Islanders' second-round pick in 2022 (45th overall) and this pick.
 The Arizona Coyotes' second-round pick went to the San Jose Sharks as the result of a trade on July 7, 2022, that sent a first-round pick in 2022 (11th overall) to Arizona in exchange for Carolina's first-round pick in 2022 (27th overall), the Islanders' second-round pick in 2022 (45th overall) and this pick.
 The San Jose Sharks' second-round pick went to the Arizona Coyotes as the result of a trade on July 17, 2021, that sent Adin Hill and a seventh-round pick in 2022 to San Jose in exchange for Josef Korenar and this pick.
 The New York Islanders' second-round pick went to the San Jose Sharks as the result of a trade on July 7, 2022, that sent a first-round pick in 2022 (11th overall) to Arizona in exchange for Carolina's first-round pick in 2022 (27th overall), a second-round pick in 2022 (34th overall) and this pick.
 The San Jose Sharks' fifth-round pick was re-acquired as the result of a trade on March 21, 2022, that sent Jake Middleton to Minnesota in exchange for Kaapo Kahkonen and this pick.
 The Arizona Coyotes' seventh-round pick went to the San Jose Sharks as the result of a trade on July 17, 2021, that sent Josef Korenar and a second-round pick in 2022 to Arizona in exchange for Adin Hill and this pick.
 The San Jose Sharks' seventh-round pick went to the Arizona Coyotes as the result of a trade on July 8, 2022, that sent Vancouver's seventh-round pick in 2023 to San Jose in exchange for this pick.
 The Minnesota Wild's seventh-round pick went to the San Jose Sharks as the result of a trade on October 5, 2020, that sent a fifth-round pick in 2022 to Minnesota in exchange for Devan Dubnyk and this pick.

Awards

References

San Jose Sharks seasons
Sharks
2022 in sports in California
2023 in sports in California